Luciano Charles Scorsese (May 8, 1913August 23, 1993) was an American film actor. He was the father of filmmaker Martin Scorsese .

Biography 
Scorsese was born in New York City, the son of Teresa and Francesco Scorsese, Sicilian immigrants from Polizzi Generosa, a small town near Palermo. He married Catherine Cappa in 1933. He was the father of Academy Award-winning film director Martin Scorsese. In 1976 he made his first film appearance in Taxi Driver, albeit in a still newspaper photograph with his wife, as Iris’ Father. He later appeared in his son’s 1980 film, Raging Bull, where he played "Charlie.” He featured in the gangster film Goodfellas in 1990, portraying "Vinnie" who was based on the real-life gangster Thomas Agro.

Filmography

References

External links

1913 births
1993 deaths
Male actors from New York City
American male film actors
American people of Italian descent
20th-century American male actors
Martin Scorsese